JVN may refer to:
 Javanese language
 John von Neumann (1903–1957), Hungarian-American polymath
 Jonathan Van Ness (born 1987), American television personality
Japan Vulnerability Notes, Japan's national computer security vulnerability database